The 1999 PGA Championship was the 81st PGA Championship, held August 12–15 at the Medinah Country Club in Medinah, Illinois, a suburb northwest of Chicago. Tiger Woods, 23, won his first PGA Championship and second major, one stroke ahead of runner-up Sergio García, age 19.

At the time, many (including noted commentator Gary McCord) predicted the start of a long rivalry between Woods and García. The teenage García's outgoing antics during the tournament had captured the attention of many golf fans, but his sole major title came over seventeen years later at the Masters in 2017.  Mike Weir, the co-leader with Woods after 54 holes, shot 80 in the final round and tied for tenth.

Although this was the first PGA Championship at Medinah, it was the fourth major; the U.S. Open was held at Course No. 3 in 1949, 1975, and 1990.  The PGA Championship returned seven years later in 2006, also won by Woods, and Medinah hosted the Ryder Cup in 2012.

Course layout

Course No. 3

Source:

Previous course lengths for major championships:
 , par 72 - 1990 U.S. Open
 , par 71 - 1975 U.S. Open
 , par 71 - 1949 U.S. Open

Round summaries

First round
Thursday, August 12, 1999

Source:

Second round
Friday, August 13, 1999

Source:

Third round
Saturday, August 14, 1999

Source:

Final round
Sunday, August 15, 1999

Source:

Scorecard
Final round

Cumulative tournament scores, relative to par

Source:

References

External links
Full results
PGA.com – 1999 PGA Championship

PGA Championship
Golf in Illinois
Medinah, Illinois
PGA Championship
PGA Championship
PGA Championship
PGA Championship